Telegraph Building was a historic commercial building located at Harrisburg, Dauphin County, Pennsylvania. It was built in 1909–1910, and was a building in the Italianate style designed by prominent Harrisburg architect Charles Howard Lloyd. Reminiscent of the Chicago school era of early skyscrapers, Lloyd drew large influence from architect Daniel H. Burnham.

Structurally, the building consisted of a front and back section: the front section was a seven-story steel frame with light brick walls and concrete floors (covered with hardwood) for offices, whereas the rear section was a darker, red-brick five-story structure with wood-panel floors and latticed steel columns. The front section's interior included a central terrazo-floored hall, which ended at the north wall separating the sections, where the elevators, stairwell, and public restrooms were located. The rear section provided large open spaces with wooden trusses supporting the roof, and access to a freight elevator.

The building formally opened to a public open house on April 28, 1910, with a 5-foot, 500 pound Seth Thomas Clock featured on the cornice and illuminated "Harrisburg Telegraph" letters on the roof, and public amazement of the central vacuuming system, a contemporary innovation.

On the site previously stood the former Shakespeare Hall, which was erected in 1822 by John Wyeth and was used by the Harrisburg Telegraph, a Republican evening newspaper. By 1909, rising circulation required a new building to be constructed. The Harrisburg Telegraph would occupy the new building from its opening until 1948, when it was sold to The Patriot-News. Charles Howard Lloyd would also use the building as the site for his offices.

It was added to the National Register of Historic Places in 1978, but was razed 5 months later for a parking lot. Finally it was delisted in 1983. It was also included in the Old Downtown Harrisburg Commercial Historic District.

References

Commercial buildings on the National Register of Historic Places in Pennsylvania
Italianate architecture in Pennsylvania
Commercial buildings completed in 1910
Buildings and structures in Dauphin County, Pennsylvania
National Register of Historic Places in Harrisburg, Pennsylvania
Former National Register of Historic Places in Pennsylvania